Damnoen Saduak (often referred to simply as Damnoen) is a district (amphoe) in western Thailand in Ratchaburi province. The central town is known for its floating market held every day till noon on a khlong not far from the district office.

Geography
Neighbouring districts are (from the east clockwise): Ban Phaeo of Samut Sakhon province; Mueang Samut Songkhram and Bang Khonthi of Samut Songkhram province; Mueang Ratchaburi, Photharam, and Bang Phae of Ratchaburi province.

The district is crossed by the Khlong Damnoen Saduak, which connects the Tha Chin with the Mae Klong Rivers.

History
Originally, most of the area in Damnoen Saduak was land. Local traveling was mainly by land route. 

Until during the King Mongkut's reign (Rama IV), he ordered the Khlong Damnoen Saduak to be excavated to connect water transportation (its name literally 'comfortable travel'). It took two years to complete handled by Somdet Chaophraya Sri Suriwongse. The official inauguration ceremony took place in 1868 at Bang Nok Khwaek, its origin. Khlong Damnoen Saduak is a longest straight line man-made canal in Thailand, it links two rivers to facilitate transportation and trading routes as mentioned above. It also connects to the Khlong Phasi Charoen, which leads to the Chao Phraya River in the Bangkok area.

Most of the workers are Chinese from southern China. When the canal was finished, they settled on two banks of the canal, resulting in the condition of the floating market and waterfront community as it appears today.

The occupation of Damnoen Saduak people in the past was mostly gardeners due to fertile land, they extended their new farmland to Khlong Damnoen Saduak. There were farmers working on their farms and others worked in transportation, at that time, there was no road, trading by waterways was very busy. There were many kinds of boats commuting in the canal, including large boats, medium-size boats, sampan boats, tugboats, wooden boats and others.

The originally local houses were made of wood. When a number of people moved into Damnoen Saduak areas, hence the houses are next to each other. There are pathways on both sides of the canal bridging all the houses, so it was easy to get by, creating a nature of the community. The geography of settlements facing each other along the waterways.

Administration

Central administration 
Damnoen Saduak is divided into 13 sub-districts (tambons), which are further subdivided into 105 administrative villages (mubans).

Local administration 
There are five sub-district municipalities (thesaban tambons) in the district:
 Prasat Sit consisting of parts of sub-district Prasat Sit.
 Bua Ngam consisting of  sub-district Bua Ngam.
 Damnoen Saduak consisting of sub-district Damnoen Saduak and parts of sub-districts Si Surat, Ta Luang, Si Muen, and Tha Nat.
 Si Don Phai consisting of parts of sub-districts Prasat Sit, Si Surat, and Don Phai.
 Ban Rai consisting of sub-district Ban Rai.

There are eight sub-district administrative organizations (SAO) in the district:
 Ta Luang consisting of parts of sub-district Ta Luang.
 Don Kruai consisting of sub-district Don Kruai.
 Don Khlang consisting of sub-district Don Khlang.
 Phaengphuai consisting of sub-district Phaengphuai.
 Si Muen consisting of parts of sub-district Si Muen.
 Tha Nat consisting of parts of sub-district Tha Nat.
 Khun Phithak consisting of sub-district Khun Phithak.
 Don Phai consisting of parts of sub-district Don Phai.

Pop culture
Damnoen Saduak is the setting of a Thai country song (luk thung), titled 'Damnoen Jaa' (ดำเนินจ๋า, "Oh Damnoen"). It was sung by Suraphol Sombatcharoen in the year 1966. It can be considered as one of his signature songs, which earned him the nickname "King of Luk Thung". The lyrics can be interpreted in two ways: describing the beauty of Damnoen girl, or mentioning his love for a woman named "Damnoen". However, this song is said to bring great pleasure to Damnoen Saduak resident.

The origin of this song took place on March 3, 1966, when four luk thung bands joined in a music contest in Damnoen Saduak. At that time, the result of the contest was judged from a garlands (phuang malai) and applause received from the audience. The band of Suraphol Sombatcharoen, who performed as the last, then they announced the first song he wrote especially for Damnoen people. It is titled "Damnoen Jaa", his band got lots of garlands from the first song. Then they continued with the second song "Nueng Nai Damnoen" (หนึ่งในดำเนิน, "One in Damnoen"), the audience poured their love to Sombatcharoen's band ever since.

For this reason, Damnoen Saduak is called "Nashville of Luk Thung".

References

External links

 amphoe.com

Damnoen Saduak